Sigovo is a rural locality (a village) in Kichmegnskoye Rural Settlement, Kichmengsko-Gorodetsky District, Vologda Oblast, Russia. The population was 54 as of 2002. There are 3 streets.

Geography 
Sigovo is located 21 km southeast of Kichmengsky Gorodok (the district's administrative centre) by road. Koskovo is the nearest rural locality.

References 

Rural localities in Kichmengsko-Gorodetsky District